Stoke Bishop is a medium-sized outer city suburb in the north-west of Bristol, located in between Westbury-on-Trym, Sneyd Park, and Sea Mills. Although relatively low, Stoke Bishop's population has increased due to substantial infilling on the Smelting Works sports ground and The Grove which used to belong to Clifton High school. The population of Stoke Bishop varies throughout the year because of the influx of students to the large campus of Bristol University halls of residence situated on the edge of the suburb and the Downs during term time.

Stoke Bishop is also the name of a council ward, which also includes Sneyd Park, The Downs open green space, much of the Avon Gorge. and a small area of Sea Mills along the River Trym.

The suburb is concentrated around a small village hall and a row of shops on Druid Hill, with a number of small local businesses.  The association with Druids arose from a megalithic monument, apparently the remains of a burial chamber, discovered in 1811 off what is now Druid Hill.  Druid Stoke House, a Grade II listed building west of Druid Hill, dates from the late 18th or early 19th century.  The suburb of Druid Stoke was developed in the grounds of Druid Stoke House in the 1930s.

Within Stoke Bishop there is a church, St Mary Magdalene (CofE); one primary school, Stoke Bishop C of E Primary, sometimes called Cedar Park, because of its location; and a village hall, which is used for a variety of activities from dog training to karate.

The historic Stoke House and Park lie in Stoke Bishop. The house was built in 1669 as a family mansion for Sir Robert Cann, Member of Parliament, Mayor of Bristol and Merchant Venturer. Stoke House is a Grade II* listed building and is currently occupied by Trinity College, Bristol.

Stoke Lodge, built in 1836, is a Grade II listed building and hosts the Stoke Bishop Adult Adult Education Centre. Alongside Stoke Lodge is a playing field, arboretum and a children's play park owned by Bristol City Council, the entire site has been held as education land since 1947. In 2011, the playing fields were long-term leased to Cotham School; these fields are the subject of a protracted legal dispute which reached the High Court in 2018 with the decision of the court being that Bristol City Council Public Rights of way committee "erred erroneously and unlawfully" when making its decision to register the playing fields as a Town/Village Green (TVG) in 2016. Following the TVG application being finally rejected in June 2018 by the Public Rights of Way committee (in light of the findings of the court), Cotham School erected new signage on the site and announced plans to fence the site to allow the school to use the playing field in a safe and secure manner, the fence was finally completed in March 2019. Since the failure of the previous TVG application a new application to register the land was made to the Commons Registration Authority in September 2018, this application is yet to be decided.

Stoke Bishop Cricket Club play at Coombe Dingle Sports Complex. The cricket club has two senior men's XIs: the 2010 season has just finished with the 1st XI winning Bristol & District League Division 1 (thus gaining promotion to the Senior Division of the Bristol & District League), while the 2nd XI finished 5th in Bristol & District League Division 2. The club also boasts a thriving junior section composed of U9, U11, U13, U15 and U17 teams.

Next to the primary school is Bristol Croquet Club, which has had many influential international members.

In the 1930s Jared and Jethro Stride built "one-off luxury homes on plots they had bought in the area". The tradition was carried on by Jared's sons Arthur and Frederick, and later into the 1960s by their sons Leslie and Raymond. The 'Stride brothers' specialised in constructing individual style homes with the emphasis on location, finish and design. each house was built to a unique design - no two are the same - and well fitted out with oak floors, wood-panelled rooms and central heating. These "high quality dwellings"  are still marketed today as classic 'Stride houses'.

The small Roman port of Abona, now Sea Mills, at the mouth of the River Trym was used by the military forces passing in transit to settlements in what is now South Wales. There are ruins of a small Roman villa at the entrance to Roman Way from the Portway. The Roman legionaries had a transit camp on what were the grounds surrounding Sneed Park House, near that villa. The district of Sneyd Park was built over most of the old Sneed Park Estate. Renamed Nazareth House, when it became a Roman Catholic Orphanage in the 1920s, the former mansion was demolished in 1970. Bombs fell in Roman Way during the Second World War, destroying one house completely.

Notable people
 Elizabeth Ayton Godwin (1817–1889), hymn writer, religious poet.
 Sir Edward Payson Wills, 1st Baronet ( 1834 - 1910 ) Tobacco Manufacturer and a director of W.D. & H.O. Wills Tobacco Company.
 José Maria de Eça de Queirós (1845–1900), Portuguese novelist who was the Portuguese consul in Bristol from 1879 to 1888.
 Sir George White, 1st Baronet (1854–1916),Tram, motor vehicle and aircraft manufacturer. Managing director of the Bristol Tramways and Carriage Company and founder of the Bristol Aeroplane Company.

References 

Areas of Bristol
Wards of Bristol